Munna-A Love Story ,   is a 2008 Indian Oriya film directed by N. Padhi This movie is
unofficial remake of Bollywood movie Jeet, starring Salman Khan, Karishma Kapoor and Sunny Deol.

Synopsis 
"Munna" played by Ollywood superstar Anubhav is a gangster in the film who works under the influence of a Mafia Don played by Mihir Das. Munna's life revolves around his crime world and his mother. A girl named "Nisha" played by Naina Dash works as a Bar Dancer and she loves Munna but has never told anything about her love to Munna. In the past Munna had loved a girl whom for some reasons he could not marry and his love interest played by Romi latter on marries Dushmant who plays the role of a cop. When at one point of time Munna was given a contract of killing the cop played by Dushmant he soon realises that the cop is now the husband of Munna's past Love interest "Pooja".The story forwards with a flashback showing the love story of Munna and what happened due to which he could not marry the girl in the past.

Cast
Anubhav Mohanty  as Munna
Dushmant
Romi as Pooja
Naina Das as Nisha
Mihir Das as Mafia Don
Anita Das
Rai Mohan

Box office reception
The Movie made on a medium budget got a wonderful opening across all the theaters but due to its weak storyline and average Music, the collections started to drop from its 2nd week. Various other factors like rains, strikes and Orissa Bandh also affected the business of the movie. The film did an average business at the box office.

References

External links
 

2008 films
Odia remakes of Hindi films
2000s Odia-language films